WDHB Strategic Learning is an international firm specialized in immersive education programs for corporations and executives. WDHB was the first company to establish the concept of Learning Expeditions and create a new international learning experience for business people. It was founded in Berkeley (California) in 1989 by Pascal Baudry and now has offices in Denver, Paris, Singapore, Shanghai and Zurich.

The company’s main offering is custom made learning programs, which are tailored for and offered to executives of a single company, and represent the fastest growing segment of the executive education market. The company uses design thinking methodology to build its programs in cooperation with clients. Programs include a large variety of activities, such as immersive visits and hands-on workshops that take place outside of the office and classroom, as well as daily debriefings. Learning Expedition themes have included evolutions in retail & customer centricity, fostering a culture of innovation, media, mobile lifestyles and models of collaboration.

WDHB’s President and CEO, Sunil Narang, is a regular speaker on experiential learning and change management. The company’s founder, Pascal Baudry, is a psychoanalyst, engineer, intercultural expert and author.

References

Companies based in Colorado